Another Story of the World is a 2017 Uruguayan comedy film directed by Guillermo Casanova. It was selected as the Uruguayan entry for the Best Foreign Language Film at the 90th Academy Awards, but it was not nominated.

Plot
In a small town controlled by an eccentric colonel and nosy mailman, two men attempt to turn the tables.

Cast
 Alfonsina Carrocio as Anita Striga
 Susana Castro as Vecina
 Nicolás Condito as Dan Valerio
 Cecilia Cósero as Amelia Valerio
 Christian Font as Locutor
 Jenny Goldstein as Rina Keffler

See also
 List of submissions to the 90th Academy Awards for Best Foreign Language Film
 List of Uruguayan submissions for the Academy Award for Best Foreign Language Film

References

External links
 

2017 films
2017 comedy films
Uruguayan comedy films
2010s Spanish-language films